William Pelham-Burn (1859–1901)  was Archdeacon of Norfolk from 1900 until his death.

Nevill was educated at Pembroke College, Oxford. After a curacy in  Bodmin he was at St Mary Abbots until becoming the Vicar of St Peter Mancroft, Norwich in 1890.

Notes

1859 births
1901 deaths
19th-century English Anglican priests
20th-century English Anglican priests
Archdeacons of Norfolk
Alumni of Pembroke College, Oxford